National Wheelchair Basketball Association (NWBA) is composed of 181 wheelchair basketball teams within twenty-two conferences. Founded in 1949 by Timothy Nugent, the NWBA today consists of men's, women's, intercollegiate, and youth teams throughout the United States and Canada. The league is made up of various divisions for athletes ranging from the ages of 5 to 18 for junior divisions, and 7 adult divisions.

The International Wheelchair Basketball Federation (IWBF) recognizes the NWBA as the National Organization for Wheelchair Basketball (NOWB) for the United States.

See also 
 Wheelchair basketball in the United States
 Harry Vines (1938–2006), former NWBA president and Hall of Fame member
Deborah Dillon Lightfoot (1956–2007), former NWBA secretary and Hall of Fame member

External links 
 National Wheelchair Basketball Association

Association
1949 establishments in the United States
Wheelchair basketball
Basketball leagues in the United States
Parasports organizations in the United States
Sports organizations established in 1949